is a 2013 Japanese animated film produced by Wit Studio and directed by Ryōtarō Makihara. It was released in Japan on June 8, 2013.

Synopsis
The story takes place in a technologically advanced society in which robots can be programmed to behave like a complete human. After a tragic plane accident, a robot, also known as Q01, is sent to a small Japanese town to help a person who just lost a loved one. While trying to heal the melancholic heart, the past of the couple is unearthed.

Voice cast

Production and release
The original film was revealed in the January 2013 issue of Shueisha's Bessatsu Margaret magazine. Ryōtarō Makihara directed the film, with Izumi Kizara writing the film's script, and manga artist Io Sakisaka providing the original character designs. The film was released in Japan on June 8, 2013. Yōko Hikasa performed the theme song "Owaranai Uta" (Unending Poem).

In July 2013, Funimation announced that they had acquired rights for a North American release.

Reception
Theron Martin of Anime News Network gave the film a B+ rating. In his review, he felt the film wasn't long enough to deliver its emotional impact but did give credit to its soft and understated score, quality artistic effort and well-cast English dub, concluding that "If you're looking for a low-key romantic tale and don't mind a big chunk of gimmickry, this one should fit the bill."

References

External links
 
 

2013 anime films
2013 films
2013 romance films
Animated romance films
2013 directorial debut films
Films set in Kyoto
Funimation
Japanese romance films
Romance anime and manga
Wit Studio
Films scored by Michiru Ōshima